José María Amador (1794 – 1883) was a Californio ranchero, gold miner, and soldier. Amador County and Amador City, both in California's Gold Country, are named after Amador, having found gold there in 1848. He is also the namesake of Amador Valley (home to the cities of Pleasanton and Dublin), a component of the Tri-Valley in Alameda County.

Biography
He was born at the Presidio of San Francisco, one of the youngest of eleven children of Pedro Amador and Ramona Noriega. He very probably named his later ranch after his mother and his maternal grandfather, Ramón Noriega. He was an older brother of Sinforosa Amador (1788–1841).

He spent his early years as a soldier and explorer, serving in the Spanish army of Nueva España, 1810–1827, then from 1827 to 1835 was mayordomo, or administrator, at the Mission San José. He was granted 4,400 acres of Mission land in 1835, which he named Rancho San Ramon.

Amador was married three times and had 22 children. He built several adobes at his rancho headquarters near Alamilla Springs in today's Dublin, California, including a two-story adobe which was used by James Dougherty in the 1860s, thereafter named Dougherty, Alameda County, California. He gradually sold the land till none was left at his death. His grave stone may be found at Gilroy, California or at the Dublin Heritage Museum and Park.

Oral history

In 1877, he was living at Whiskey Hill, Santa Cruz County when Thomas Savage recorded Amador's “Memorias sobre la Historia de California,” which survives as a manuscript in the Bancroft Library.

Rancho San Ramon

With the cession of California to the United States following the Mexican–American War, the 1848 Treaty of Guadalupe Hidalgo provided that the land grants would be honored. Amador gradually sold his rancho. James Witt Dougherty bought  in 1852.

Legacy of geographical names

Amador mined along a nameless creek in 1848 and 1849. His presence gave his surname to the creek, two villages on its banks, and, in 1854, a new county.

There was no settlement where Amador City is now until the summer of 1851, after gold outcroppings had been prospected on both sides of "Amador's Creek", upstream several hundred yards from downtown. The "Original" or "Little" Amador mine and the Spring Hill were probably Amador County's first gold mines. With the discovery of such quartz gold, the settlement that was upstream where the stage road crossed "Amador's creek" or Amador Crossing, gradually moved to "South Amador" or Amador City where French Gulch drains into the creek. The city's most famous and productive mine, the Keystone was organized in 1853 out of two or more claims and before it closed for good in 1942 it produced in intermittent operation about $24 million in gold at much lower gold prices.

Amador City's and Amador County were incorporated June 14, 1854, being named for Jose Maria Amador, the soldier, rancher and miner, who was born in San Francisco in 1794, the son of Sergeant Pedro Amador, a Spanish soldier who settled in California in 1771. In 1848, Jose Maria Amador, with several Indians, established a successful gold mining camp near the present town of Amador. In Spanish, the word amador means "one who loves".

References

1794 births
1883 deaths
Oral historians
Ranchers from California
American miners
People from San Francisco
People from Dublin, California